Parrillas One (pronounced pah-RI-yas OH-neh) is a Honduran football team based in San Pedro Sula, Cortés.

For the 2012–13 season they played at Estadio Alfredo León Gómez in Tela. They were first promoted to Liga Nacional de Futbol de Honduras in the 2013 where they confirmed they will remain in Tela. The sponsor is Parrillas y Repuestos One, an automobile body shop.

History

The team is named for the sponsor, Parrillas y Repuestos One, an automobile body shop. Parrillas means "[car] grilles" in Spanish and One (pronounced "Oh-neh") is the company owner and club chairman's childhood nickname.

The club was founded in 1993 as a leisure team for workers of the car paint shop, Parrillas One who played amateur pick-up games on Saturdays. The club later joined Liga Comercial Emin Abufelle, an amateur league for company football teams.

Professional career
In 2000, Parrillas One bought Palestino's spot in Segunda Division (Second Division). A year later the team reached their first Second Division final against Honduras Salzburg where they were defeated and lost a chance to win promotion to First Division.
They reached a final again in 2010–11 Apertura, where they defeated Yoro on 3–2 aggregated score. Since 2004, promotion to Liga Nacional has been contested by apertura and clausura winners. Parrillas, as apertura champions, faced Atlético Choloma to decide promotion and once again lost a chance to play in the Honduran top-flight football. The team contested promotion again as 2011–12 Clausura champions against Real Sociedad. For the third time in their history Parrillas lost a chance for promotion.

For three years straight Parrillas reached a promotion final as 2012–13 Clausura champions. They faced Juticalpa in a new promotion system of one leg, in a neutral stadium. Comayagua was chosen to host the promotion final, where the match ended 1–1 in regular time and Parrillas became the new Liga Nacional team for 2013–14 winning 5–4 in penalties.

They made their debut at Honduras' top level on 10 August 2013 against Vida and won 2–1. They qualified to the play-offs in their first tournament by finishing in 6th place. They qualified over Victoria, finishing with the same points and goal difference but scoring 1 more goal.

The club was scheduled to open their own new stadium, Estadio Parrillas One, in La Lima by early 2019.

Achievements
Segunda División / Liga de Ascenso
Winners (3): 2010–11 A, 2011–12 C, 2012–13 C
Runners-up (2): 2001–02, 2015–16 C

List of coaches
 Allan Bennett (2011)
 Wilmer Cruz (2011 – Feb 12)
 Emilio Umanzor (Feb 2012–13)
 Luis Enrique Cálix "Gavilán"  (Jan 2013–13)
 Carlos Ramón Tábora (2014)
 Douglas Munguía (July 2014 – Sept 14)
 Hernán Garcia (Oct 2014–)

References

Football clubs in Honduras
Association football clubs established in 1993
1993 establishments in Honduras